Saint-Aignan-des-Gués is a former commune in the Loiret department in north-central France. On 1 January 2017, it was merged into the new commune Bray-Saint Aignan. Its population was 293 in 2019.

See also
Communes of the Loiret department

References

Saintaignandesgues